FAM71F2 or Family with Sequence Similarity 71 member F2 is a protein that in humans is encoded by the Family with Sequence Similarity 71 member F2 gene. This gene is highly active in the reproductive tissues, specifically the testis, and may serve as a potential biomarker for determining metastatic testicular cancer.

Gene

Location 

FAM71F2 gene is located on chromosome 7 in humans (7q32.1), starting at 128,671,636 and ending at 128,702,262 on the positive strand. The gene paralog FAM71F1 and the gene LINC01000 directly neighbor FAM71F2 on chromosome 7.

Size of gene 
The gene spans 30,627 base pairs and codes for 12 exons.

Common aliases 
FAM71F2 is also referred to as family with sequence similarity 137 member B, FAM137B.

mRNA 
FAM71F2 has 14 transcript variants. Isoform a is the longest of the mRNA transcripts and spans 5,775 base pairs that translates into a 309 amino acids sequence. It codes for 5 exons.  Other alternative splice isoforms are labelled in the diagram in Figure 2.

At the first splice site, Isoform b, found in most reptiles having FAM71F2 protein, deletes the following nine amino acids and picks up at the valine amino acid at location 61 in humans. Isoform c uses an alternative downstream start site to Isoform a and adds another exon between the first and second exons of Isoform a.

General properties 
The molecular weight of FAM71F2 is 34.5 kilo Daltons. The isoelectric point is 6.15.

Domains and motifs 
FAM71F2 protein contains only one domain, named domain of unknown function, DUF3699. This domain is located from amino acids 114-185 on the human FAM71F2 protein.  This domain family is found only in eukaryotes and approximately 71 amino acids in length. There is also a potential R-2 mitochondrial pre-sequence cleavage site that would signal the protein to the mitochondria. These sites are labelled in Figure 4 below.

Secondary structure 
The secondary structure of FAM71F2 contains alpha helices and beta sheets. These structures are identified in the generated image of the FAM71F2 protein in Figure 3. Highly conserved amino acid residues, such as the Val61-Thr62-Lys63 sequence where the reptiles and isoform b pick up in the second exon, are labelled on this figure as well.

Post-translational modifications 
FAM71F2 has seven highly conserved phosphorylated sites. There is one acetylation site and one N-glycosylation site, playing a role in stabilizing the protein.

Sub-cellular localization 
FAM71F2 protein stays in the cytoplasm of cells, but may have localization in the nucleus and mitochondria.

Expression

Tissue expression pattern 
FAM71F2 is highly expressed in reproductive structures, such as the testis, epididymis, uterus and ovaries. There is some expression in the brain and connective tissue as well. As development stages progress, the number of gene transcripts increases and are at highest expression levels in adults. In the mouse, during spermatogenesis and development of the testis, gene transcript levels of FAM71F2 increase dramatically.

Cellular expression 
FAM71F2 protein expression has been detected in the cytoplasm of Leydig cells and in epididymis cells of the male testis and is also detected in the cytoplasm in ovarian follicles.

Expression level 
FAM71F2 is moderately expressed in comparison to other proteins in the human, with an average protein expression level of 8.47 part per million.

Clinical significance 
FAM71F2 is repressed in males with non-obstructive azoospermia and teratozoospermia, or abnormalities in sperm morphology and quantity. These diseases lead to fertility issues. In addition, FAM71F2 gene expression is up-regulated with Dopamine receptor D1 expression in testicular cancer patients, and may be an important biomarker for metastatic forms of this cancer.

Homology 
FAM71F2 has 91 orthologs in other animal species. Its evolutionary history goes as far back as the reptiles, and its most distant relative is the homolog in the west Indian Ocean coelacanth. The time of divergence between eight orthologs from the human FAM71F2 is shown in Figure 5. It is not found in birds or in Gallus gallus (chicken). FAM71F2 has six paralogs in humans: FAM71A, FAM71B, FAM71C, FAM71D, FAM71E1, and FAM71F1.

References 

Genes on human chromosome 7